Male Loče is a small village northwest of Podgrad in the Municipality of Ilirska Bistrica in the Inner Carniola region of Slovenia.

The local church in the settlement is dedicated to Saint Michael and belongs to the Parish of Hrušica.

References

External links

Male Loče on Geopedia

Populated places in the Municipality of Ilirska Bistrica